The 1985 Women's South American Volleyball Championship was the 16th edition of the Women's South American Volleyball Championship, organised by South America's governing volleyball body, the Confederación Sudamericana de Voleibol (CSV). It was held in Caracas, Venezuela, from 25 July to 1 August.

Final standing

External links 
 todor66.com

Women's South American Volleyball Championships
South American Volleyball Championships
Volleyball
1985 Volleyball
1985 in South American sport
International volleyball competitions hosted by Venezuela
July 1985 sports events in South America
August 1985 sports events in South America